Parua Bay is a locality and bay on the northern side of the Whangarei Harbour in Northland, New Zealand. Whangarei is 19 km to the west, and Whangarei Heads are 10 km to the south east, with Munro Bay between the two. The western head is called Manganese Point, and the eastern is Reserve Point. The Nook is a small bay just to the north of Reserve Point.

The bay is sheltered and about 4 km wide, with about one kilometer between the headlands. The central bay has deep water, but there are wide intertidal zones around the coast. Motukiore Island is just inside Manganese Point and joined to it by a causeway at low tide, although the only practical access is by water. The contours of a defensive pā on the island are still clearly visible.

Solomon's Point divides the bay into two. The point is named after the Māori chief Horomona-Kaikou.

History

Raro-ngaua was a pā on the eastern side of the Parua Bay entrance in the early 19th century. In 1821 or 1822, this pā was attacked by a group of Ngāti Paoa and Waikato warriors, as part of the Musket Wars.

In 1838, Thomas Stewart Scott and two partners bought land on the western side of the bay and set up a shipbuilding yard. Manganese ore lay in lumps on the point to the south of the shipyard, then known as Te Waro but now called Manganese Point. The ore was sold in 1844. In 1849, a hydrographic survey was made of Whangarei Harbour by Captain Lort Stokes in the paddle-steamer HMS Acheron. He named Parua Bay "Bad Maori Bay" and Manganese Point "Annoyance Point".

By the mid-1850s, there were four European families living in a small settlement on the western side of the bay.

An Irish surveyor called James Irwin Wilson settled in the Nook in 1858, and fell in love with Joanna Munro, the daughter of a Nova Scotian settler from Munro Bay. Her father, John Munro, was unhappy that Wilson had bought land that he wanted, and opposed their union. The pair tried to elope but were caught. A second elopement was successful and they married in Auckland. John Munro eventually accepted the marriage, and one of James' brothers later married Joanna's sister.

Demographics
Statistics New Zealand describes Parua Bay as a rural settlement. The settlement is part of the larger Parua Bay statistical area.

Parua Bay settlement had a population of 597 at the 2018 New Zealand census, an increase of 120 people (25.2%) since the 2013 census, and an increase of 198 people (49.6%) since the 2006 census. There were 207 households, comprising 306 males and 297 females, giving a sex ratio of 1.03 males per female, with 162 people (27.1%) aged under 15 years, 48 (8.0%) aged 15 to 29, 285 (47.7%) aged 30 to 64, and 102 (17.1%) aged 65 or older.

Ethnicities were 91.5% European/Pākehā, 11.6% Māori, 1.0% Pacific peoples, 3.5% Asian, and 3.5% other ethnicities. People may identify with more than one ethnicity.

Although some people chose not to answer the census's question about religious affiliation, 61.3% had no religion, 25.1% were Christian, 0.5% were Hindu, 1.0% were Buddhist and 3.0% had other religions.

Of those at least 15 years old, 159 (36.6%) people had a bachelor's or higher degree, and 45 (10.3%) people had no formal qualifications. 93 people (21.4%) earned over $70,000 compared to 17.2% nationally. The employment status of those at least 15 was that 204 (46.9%) people were employed full-time, 87 (20.0%) were part-time, and 15 (3.4%) were unemployed.

Parua Bay statistical area

The statistical area had a population of 2,460 at the 2018 New Zealand census, an increase of 447 people (22.2%) since the 2013 census, and an increase of 534 people (27.7%) since the 2006 census. There were 918 households, comprising 1,221 males and 1,239 females, giving a sex ratio of 0.99 males per female. The median age was 49.7 years (compared with 37.4 years nationally), with 471 people (19.1%) aged under 15 years, 231 (9.4%) aged 15 to 29, 1,152 (46.8%) aged 30 to 64, and 606 (24.6%) aged 65 or older.

Ethnicities were 90.4% European/Pākehā, 15.1% Māori, 2.0% Pacific peoples, 2.6% Asian, and 1.7% other ethnicities. People may identify with more than one ethnicity.

The percentage of people born overseas was 25.0, compared with 27.1% nationally.

Although some people chose not to answer the census's question about religious affiliation, 59.5% had no religion, 29.6% were Christian, 0.5% were Hindu, 0.7% were Buddhist and 2.3% had other religions.

Of those at least 15 years old, 510 (25.6%) people had a bachelor's or higher degree, and 294 (14.8%) people had no formal qualifications. The median income was $35,900, compared with $31,800 nationally. 435 people (21.9%) earned over $70,000 compared to 17.2% nationally. The employment status of those at least 15 was that 894 (44.9%) people were employed full-time, 300 (15.1%) were part-time, and 63 (3.2%) were unemployed.

Education
Parua Bay School is a coeducational full primary (years 1–8) school with a roll of  students as of

Notes

Whangarei District
Populated places in the Northland Region
Bays of the Northland Region